Dois Riachos is a municipality located in the West of the Brazilian state of Alagoas. Its population is 11,067 (2020) and its area is 140 km².

Dois Riachos is the birthplace of Marta, among the most notable woman football players in the world.

References

Municipalities in Alagoas